Brakothrips is a genus of thrips in the family Phlaeothripidae, first described by Crespi, Morris and Mound in 2004. The type species is Brakothrips gillesi. Insects in this genus are found only in Australia, living under the splitting bark of young branches of Acacias  (but one species utilises a similar habitat in Eucalyptus cinerea).

Species
 Brakothrips bullus
 Brakothrips gillesi
 Brakothrips maafi
 Brakothrips meandarra
 Brakothrips pilbara
 Brakothrips sculptilis
 Brakothrips stenos

References

External links
Description of Brakothrips

Phlaeothripidae
Thrips
Thrips genera
Taxa named by Laurence Alfred Mound
Insects described in 2004